Juan Miguel Torres (born: 26 February 1968) is a sailor from the Philippines. who represented his country at the 1992 Summer Olympics in Barcelona, Spain as crew member in the Soling. With helmsman Mario Almario and fellow crew member Teodorico Asejo they took the 24th place.

References

Living people
1961 births
Sailors at the 1992 Summer Olympics – Soling
Olympic sailors of the Philippines
Filipino male sailors (sport)